Arunima Lamsal is a Nepalese actress.

Partial filmography

Actress

References

Nepalese film actresses
Nepalese female models
21st-century Nepalese actresses
People from Biratnagar
Living people
Year of birth missing (living people)